Jangipur Lok Sabha constituency is a parliamentary constituency in Murshidabad district of West Bengal, India. All the seven assembly segments of No.9 Jangipur Lok Sabha constituency are in Murshidabad district.

Assembly segments

As per order of the Delimitation Commission in respect of the delimitation of constituencies in the West Bengal, parliamentary constituency no. 9 Jangipur is composed of the following segments from 2009:

In 2004 Jangipur Lok Sabha constituency was composed of the following assembly segments:Farakka (assembly constituency no. 50), Aurangabad (assembly constituency no. 51), Suti (assembly constituency no. 52), Sagardighi (SC) (assembly constituency no. 53), Jangipur (assembly constituency no. 54), Nabagram (assembly constituency no. 57), Khargram (SC) (assembly constituency no. 66)

Members of Parliament

^ denotes by-elections

Election results

17th Lok Sabha: 2019 General Elections

General election 2014

By election 2012

General election 2009

General election 2004

General election 1999

General election 1998

General elections 1967-2004
Most of the contests were multi-cornered. However, only winners and runners-up are mentioned below:

References

See also
 Jangipur
 List of Constituencies of the Lok Sabha

Lok Sabha constituencies in West Bengal
Politics of Murshidabad district